The Ligue d'Athlétisme de la Guyane (LAG) is the governing body for the sport of athletics in French Guiana.  Last president was Daniel Lapompe-Paironne.  He was replaced by Gaëtan Tariaffe.

As LAG is part of the Fédération française d'athlétisme, athletes from French Guiana normally participate internationally for France, e.g., in European Athletics Championships as organized by the EAA.  On the other hand, French Guiana as a French overseas department is part of the Caribbean.  As an observer member of CACAC, French Guiana is invited to participate at the championships, and also at the CARIFTA Games.

History 
LAG was founded on January 10, 1963, as the Ligue Régionale d'Athlétisme de la Guyane. First president was Victor Périgny.

Affiliations 
Fédération française d'athlétisme (FAA)
LAG is an observer member federation for French Guiana in the
Central American and Caribbean Athletic Confederation (CACAC)
LAG is invited to participate at the 
CARIFTA Games

Regional records 
LAG maintains the French Guiana records in athletics.

External links 
Official webpage (in French)

References 

French Guiana
Sports governing bodies in French Guiana
Athletics in French Guiana
1963 establishments in France
National governing bodies for athletics
Sports organizations established in 1963